Maharaja Sri Rama Chandra Bhanja Deva (17 December 1870 – 22 February 1912) was the Maharaja of Mayurbhanj State of India.

Personal life

Early life

He was only eleven years old when his father and ruler of the Mayurbhanj State, Maharaja Krishna Chandra Bhanj Deo died; Sriram Chandra Bhanjadeo succeeded to the throne on 29 May 1882. However, at that time the State was ruled under a British Commissioner till Maharaja came of age; he was formally installed as Maharaja on 15 August 1892. The affairs of state remained in the hands of his grandmother, the Dowager Maharani of Mayurbhanj, until he took charge some years later.

Matrimonial alliances

He was first married to Maharani Lakshmi Kumari Devi,  daughter of a zamindar of Panchkot in Bengal, who died in 1902. In 1904, he married Maharani Sucharu Devi, a daughter of Maharshi Keshub Chandra Sen. He had two sons, Purna Chandra Bhanj Deo and Pratap Chandra Bhanj Deo with his first wife. Purna Chandra Bhanj Deo succeeded him to the throne, while Pratap Chandra Bhanj Deo succeeded his elder brother to the throne after the former's death. He had a son, Dhrubendra Chandra Bhanj Deo and two daughters of his second wife, Sucharu Devi. Dhrubendra Chandra Bhanj Deo became an air force pilot and died in action during the Second World War.
The elder daughter was married to the Maharaja of Vizianagaram and the younger daughter, Rani Jyoti Manjari Devi was married to Mahant Sarveshwar Das, the Raja Bahadur of Nandgaon, a princely state of the erstwhile Central Provinces and Berar.

Death

Maharaja died due to an accident, while on a hunting trip, when he was accidentally injured by the bullet fired from the gun of his brother-in-law (brother of Sucharu Devi). He was severely injured and was treated in Calcutta, but died there of his injuries.

Work

Administration
He worked for the all around development of Mayurbhanj and implemented various welfare schemes designed to help the people. He was revered as a philosopher king. He constituted the state council for administration in the state and brought about reforms in the sphere of language, health and administration.

During his reign, the scientific operation of iron mines was started for the first time and Gorumahisani mines were leased to the Tatas. In 1903, he commissioned a narrow-gauge railway line from Rupsa to Baripada known as Mayurbhanj State Railway. During his reign 474 miles of road were built in State connecting all divisional towns with Baripada. The Baripada Municipality was constituted by him in 1905. He also started an English High School with boarding facility, a government Press, a fully equipped hospital and a leper asylum in Baripada.

He appointed Mohini Mohan Dhar the Dewan of Mayurbhanj. Impressed with the noble qualities of Gopabandhu Das he made him his advocate.

Art and culture
He was a great patron of Oriya art and culture. The famous Chhau dance of Orissa or "war-dance" was presented by him for a show in 1912 in Calcutta in honor of George V, the British emperor, who was impressed by its beauty and splendour.

He was also a patriot and great patron of the Odia language and presided over the first meeting of Utkal Samilani held on 3 December 1903.

Architecture
In 1892, he made major additions to the royal palace of Mayurbhanj, which has 126 rooms. The front of the palace resembles the Buckingham Palace, which was built in 1908. Two colleges, Maharaja Purna Chandra College, and the Government Women's College are now located inside the palace.

Honours

Delhi Durbar Gold Medal – 1903.
Maharaja title bestowed upon him by Lord Minto at the 1903 Delhi Durbar, which was later made hereditary in 1910.

Legacy

He died on 22 February 1912 at Mayurbhanj. He and his father Maharaja Krushna Chandra Bhanja Deo are widely acknowledged as the makers of modern Orissa. The legacy include;
 Srirama Chandra Bhanja Medical College and Hospital at Cuttack was named after him in year 1951, in recognition of the donation and efforts made by the ruler in his lifetime.
 Maharaja Sriram Chandra Bhanjdeo University, Baripada, a public university location in hometown of the Maharaja.

References

External links

1870 births
1912 deaths
Hindu monarchs
Indian maharajas
Founders of Indian schools and colleges
History of Odisha
19th-century Indian monarchs
20th-century Indian monarchs
People from Odisha
Firearm accident victims
Deaths by firearm in India
Accidental deaths in India